Chishui is a county-level city of Guizhou Province, China, bordering Sichuan to the north and west.  It is under the administration of the prefecture-level city of Zunyi.

The city has a total area of 1,801 km2, and in 2007, it had a population of 300,000.

The bamboo is used for paper production and bamboo weaving among others.

In 1935 the Battle of Chishui River took place in the city.

Climate

References

External links
  Chishui City Government website

Cities in Guizhou
Zunyi